Alessio Ferrazza (born 26 January 1986) is an Italian football midfielder who currently plays for FC Chiasso.

References
 Football.ch profile

1986 births
Living people
Italian footballers
Italian expatriate footballers
AC Bellinzona players
FC Chiasso players
Expatriate footballers in Switzerland
Italian expatriate sportspeople in Switzerland
Association football midfielders